Metriopepla is a monotypic genus of leaf beetles in the subfamily Cassidinae. It contains one species, Metriopepla inornata, that is distributed in the Democratic Republic of the Congo, Ethiopia, Ivory Coast, Malawi, Mozambique, South Africa, Tanzania and Zambia.

References 

Cassidinae
Chrysomelidae genera
Beetles of Africa
Monotypic beetle genera
Taxa named by Léon Fairmaire
Taxa described in 1882
Beetles of the Democratic Republic of the Congo